The 2016 Pan American Men's Handball Championship was the 17th official competition for senior men's national handball teams of North, Center, Caribbean and South America. It was held from 11 to 19 June 2016 at the Tecnópolis in Buenos Aires, Argentina. It also acted as the qualifying competition for the 2017 World Men's Handball Championship in France, securing three vacancies for the World Championship.

Brazil won the tournament for the third time after defeating Chile 28–24 in the final.

Participating teams

Venezuela was originally qualified but withdrew due to economic trouble. The Pan-American Team Handball Federation chose Mexico to replace it.

Preliminary round
The draw was held on 23 April 2016 at the Planetario in Buenos Aires.

All times are local (UTC−3).

Group A

Group B

Knockout stage

Bracket

5th place bracket

5–8th place semifinals

Semifinals

Eleventh place game

Ninth place game

Seventh place game

Fifth place game

Third place game

Final

Final ranking

Awards
All-star team
Goalkeeper:  Matías Schulz
Right Wing:  Fábio Chiuffa
Right Back:  Rodrigo Salinas
Playmaker:  Sebastián Simonet
Left Back:  Minik Dahl Høegh
Left Wing:  Felipe Ribeiro
Pivot:  Esteban Salinas

References

External links
Official website
Results on todor66.com

2016 Men
Pan American Men's Handball Championship
Pan American Men's Handball Championship
H
Sports competitions in Buenos Aires
June 2016 sports events in South America